Aranthodu is a village located 12 km south of Sullia town, towards Madikeri and Mysore.  It is located at a distance of 97 km south-east of Mangalore city.

The village is surrounded with rich water sources which, in fact, prompted its name. 'Aranthodu' is derived from 'aaru thodu' in Kannada, which means six streams. The river Payaswini flows through this village. The village livelihood mainly depends on agriculture/horticulture.

People visiting the Mallikarjuna temple in Thodikana generally take the road heading south from Aranthodu. 

Arekannada, Kannada, Tulu and Malayalam are spoken here.

References 

Villages in Dakshina Kannada district